Podvrh is a small settlement in the hills above the left bank of the Kolpa River in the Municipality of Osilnica in southern Slovenia. It lies in the traditional region of Lower Carniola and is now included in the Southeast Slovenia Statistical Region.

There is a small chapel-shrine in the settlement dedicated to the Virgin Mary. It dates from 1840.

References

External links
Podvrh on Geopedia

Populated places in the Municipality of Osilnica